Corn soup is a soup made of corn, typically sweetcorn. Initially popular only in corn-producing areas of the world, the dish is now widespread because of greater corn distribution. Typical ingredients are corn cut from the cob, water, butter and flour, with salt and pepper for seasoning. Additional ingredients vary by region, and may include eggs.

Native Americans 
Corn, being a staple crop for many Native American tribes has led to corn soup being a primary food among them.  M. R. Harrington reported that 1908 hulled-corn soup onno'kwǎ''' was the most popular dish for the Seneca Indians. He also stated, "[s]eldom do the Indians, pagan or Christian, meet for any function [...] without a kettle of onno'kwǎ', hot and savory, to regale the crowd". The soup was served at religious events, the people getting a ladleful every time they encircled the kettle.

 List of corn soup dishes 

Several types of soups are prepared using corn as a primary ingredient.
 Cream of corn soup and creamed corn soup
 Sweet corn soup
 Corn crab soup
 Chinese sweet corn soup (yumigeng or sumigeng'')
 Dried (Indian) corn soup
 Patasca - Peruvian corn and meat soup
 Pozole - mexican corn soup
 Tibetan style corn soup (Ashom Tang)
 Suam na mais
 Ginataang mais
 Chicken Corn Soup (A Pennsylvania Dutch  soup with hard-boiled egg whites instead of noodles)

See also

 Corn chowder
 Corn stew
 List of maize dishes
 List of soups

References 

American soups
Native American cuisine
Pre-Columbian Native American cuisine
Maize dishes
Dishes featuring sweet corn